Namika Lahti was a basketball club based in Lahti, Finland. The club played in the Korisliiga, the top Finnish championship league. The club was established in 1898 in Vyborg and moved to Lahti in 1947. In 2015, the club was dissolved, after economic problems.

Name and history 
"Namika" is a nickname for NMKY, meaning YMCA. The association was founded in 1898 in Vyborg, and moved to Lahti after the World War II as Vyborg became a part of Soviet Union.

Titles

Korisliiga (2):
2000, 2009
Runners-up (4): 1996, 2002, 2004, 2007
Third place: 2001 
Finnish Cup (3):
1989, 1994, 2000

Season by season

Notable players
 Ricky Hickman (1 season: 2009–10)
 Robert Arnold (1 season: 2013–14)
 Timo Lampen (8 seasons: 1959-67, retired jersey #6)

References

External links
Official website

Defunct basketball teams in Finland
Sport in Lahti
Sports clubs founded by the YMCA
1898 establishments in Finland
2015 disestablishments in Finland